Otto Kleinschmidt (13 December 1870 – 25 March 1954) was a German  ornithologist, theologist and pastor.

Career

Kleinschmidt was born as the son of the factory overseer Adolph Kleinschmidt and his wife Elise (maiden name Dreydorf) in Geinsheim (Kornsand) on the Rhine. The house of the family was located miles from anywhere in between unspoiled countryside. Otto Kleinschmidt was already as a young boy highly interested in nature and the world of the birds. Besides that it was kind of a family tradition to research and collect. Already at the age of 8 Otto prepared his first taxidermied birds.

He introduced a typological species concept into German ornithology. His Formenkreis theory influenced the early ideas of Erwin Stresemann. Others have considered him one of the first biogeographers. His position was that similar "forms" (species) found in geographically distant regions could be accounted for by "formation rings" – with a fixed set of characters. This allowed him to support creationism while explaining biogeographical similarities.

Kleinschmidt's book The Formenkreis Theory and the Progress of the Organic World was translated in 1930 by Francis Charles Robert Jourdain. Mixed reviews appeared in American and British journals.

Historians of science Georgy S. Levit, Kay Meister and Uwe Hoßfeld have noted that:

Kleinschmidt’s creationistic concept led him not only to the rejection of the Darwinian theory of descent, but also to the negation of the post-Mendelian genetics. His criticism of the Darwinian principles is one of the most intensive and extensive assaults on the proper evolutionism. At the same time, his studies on individual and geographic variation of Palaearctic birds delivered valuable biological data, which seriously contributed to the empirical basis of biological systematics.

Professor of biology Eugene Potapov argues that despite Kleinschmidt's writings being obscure and rarely cited today, he nevertheless "outlined the modern genetic approach to the understanding of the systematics of large falcons."

Published works
 Kleinschmidt O. 1897. [No title]. Journal für Ornithologie 45: 518–519.
 Kleinschmidt, O. (1900) Arten oder Formenkreise? Journal für Ornithologie 48:134–139
 Kleinschmidt, O. 1921. Die Singvögel der Heimat. Verlag von Quelle & Meyer, Leipzig.
 Kleinschmidt O. 1926. Der weitere Ausbau der Formenkreislehre. Journal für Ornithologie 74: 405–408.
 Kleinschmidt O. 1930. The Formenkreis Theory and the Progress of the Organic World: A Re-Casting of the Theory of Descent and Race-Study to Prepare the Way for a Harmonious Conception of the Universal Reality. London, H.F. & G. Witherby. (translated by Francis Charles Robert Jourdain)
 Kleinschmidt O. 1933 Kurzgefaßte deutsche Rassenkunde. Armanen-Verlag, Leipzig.
 Kleinschmidt O. 1933. Blut und Rasse. Die Stellung des evangelischen Christen zu den Forderungen der Eugenik. Unter Zugrundelegung eines am 18. April 1933 auf der zweiten Konferenz evangelischer Akademiker in Hannover gehaltenen Vortrags. Verlag Martin Warneck, Berlin.
 Kleinschmidt O. 1934–2000. Die Raubvögel der Heimat. Klassiker der Ornithologie. Aula-Verlag GmbH & Co. Wiebelsheim Die Raubvögel der Heimat  – Predator Birds of the Homeland
 Kleinschmidt O. 1949. Die Kolibris. 
 Kleinschmidt O. 1950. Der Zauber von Brehms Tierleben. (Neue Brehm-Bücherei) Geest&Portig. Lpzg. A.Ziemsen Vlg. Wittenberg/Lutherstadt. 
 Kleinschmidt A. 1950. Leben und Werk. Syllegomena Biologica. Festschrift zum 80. Geburtstage von Herrn Pastor Dr. Med. H.C. O. Kleinschmidt, Lutherstadt Wittenberg am 13. Dezember 1950 eds, A. von Jordans & F. Peus pp. 1–31. Leipzig: Wittenberg.

See also

Albert Fleischmann

References

Other sources
 Clancey PA. 1950. Some appreciative remarks on the work of Dr Otto Kleinschmidt by a British avian taxonomist. Syllegomena Biologica. Festschrift zum 80. Geburtstage von Herrn Pastor Dr. Med. H.C.O. Kleinschmidt, Lutherstadt Wittenberg am 13. Dezember 1950 eds, A. von Jordans & F. Peus, pp. 31–34. Leipzig: Wittenberg.

External links
 
 Thesis (German) in PDF

1870 births
1954 deaths
Christian creationists
German ornithologists
German theologians